The Mask of Enlightenment: Nietzsche’s Zarathustra is a book by Stanley Rosen with a foreword by Michael Allen Gillespie in which the author provides a detailed commentary on Nietzsche's Thus Spoke Zarathustra.

Reception
The book has been reviewed by Aaron Ridley, Martin Liebscher, Jonathan Salem-Wiseman and Kathleen Marie Higgins

References

External links

2004 non-fiction books
English non-fiction books
English-language books
Cambridge University Press books
Yale University Press books
1995 non-fiction books
Books about Friedrich Nietzsche